Amalia Margaryan (also written as Amaliya Margaryan) (born 10 February 1995) is an Armenian singer, a songwriter, whose musical career started in 2015, when she participated in "X-Factor" Ukraine and "The Voice Russia" contest, which brought her the first recognition. Amalia became more famous for  Armenian audience with participation in Depi Evratesil contest 1st and 2nd seasons (Armenia's Eurovision Song Contest National Selection).

Biography 
Amalia (Amaliya) Margaryan was born in 1995, 10 February, in Armenia, Yerevan. She graduated from Yerevan School No. 8 after Alexander Pushkin. In 2012 she entered Yerevan State University Faculty of Law and graduated in 2016. She started singing at the age of three, when she started attending the "Little Singers of Armenia" children's choir, the founder and artistic director of which is Tigran Hekekyan. She sang here for more than 12 years. During this period she entered and graduated from the Sayat-Nova Music School with a piano degree. During her student years, Amalia was convinced that she would never pursue a musical career. However, in her second year, she began attending vocal classes with Maran Karapetyan, with whom she still collaborates.

2015: X-Factor Ukraine and The Voice Russia 
In 2015, Amalia decided to take part in the Armenian auditions of the Ukrainian "X-Factor" project. A few months later, she received an unexpected phone call from the project organizers who informed her that she had been selected as a contestant. Amalia overcame the first round, singing Conchita Wurst's song "Rise Like a Phoenix". Her live performance received a lot of positive feedback, moreover, after the video was published on the official YouTube page of the "X-Factor", it gathered millions of views and became the most-watched video of that season. That performance became a turning point for the singer, bringing her the first fame in Ukraine, as well as in Armenia. A few weeks after returning from Kyiv, Amalia decided to take part in "The Voice Russia" project. Successfully qualifying the first round, she made it to the "Blind Audition". During the "Blind audition", Amalia performed Maxim Fadeev's song "Танцы на стёклах". From the four jury members, Basta turned and Amalia picked him as her coach. This performance also received a lot of feedback and gained more than 4 million views on YouTube. During "The Battle" Amalia performed together with another Armenian participant, Sergey Urumyan. Together they performed "Всё в твоих руках" song". From the duo, Basta chose Sergey and Amalia was disqualified from the project.

2017: Depi Evratesil & Eurovision Song Contest 2017 
In 2017, the Armenian public television announced national selection of the Armenian contestant to the Eurovision Song Contest – Depi Evratesil. The artists were performing songs by different singers, and the one who overcomes all the stages should have the opportunity to represent Armenia in the Eurovision Song Contest 2017. Amalia decided to take part in it. Successfully overcoming the first stage, she appeared in singer Hayko's team and reached till the pre-election stage. Although Amalia didn't win the contest, she joined the Armenian delegation as that year's participant – Artsvik's backing vocalist.

2018–present: Depi Evratesil and First Music Video 
In 2018 Armenian Public Television again announced the national selection of the Armenian contestant to the Eurovision Song Contest – Depi Evratesil. This time participants had to present their own songs, which in case of winning should have been sung on the Eurovision stage. Amalia decided to take part one more time. This was the first time she performed her own co-authored song "Waiting for the sun" (music & lyrics by Amalia Margaryan & Vahram Yanikyan). She was warmly welcomed by the Armenian and European audience, moreover, she was one of the hot favorites of the year to win the contest. She reached the final stage. After a successful performance in Depi Evratesil, in 2018 Amalia received an offer to take part in the famous Romanian "Cerbul de Aur" competition, which was held in Brașov. During the competition, Amalia performed her co-authored song "Waiting for the Sun" as well as the song "Promit" by the famous Romanian singer Paula Seling. Amalia took the 4th place. In 2018 Amalia was amongst the Armenian jury members f the Junior Eurovision Song Contest 2018 and in 2019 as a member of the Armenian jury for the Eurovision Song Contest 2019. 
In May 2019, Amalia performed at the Karen Demirchyan Sports and Concert Complex at a concert dedicated to the 95th anniversary of the great chansonnier Charles Aznavour, where she shared the stage together with world-famous French singers Patrick Fiori, Hélène Ségara, and Slimane and many others. During the concert, Amalia performed Charles Aznavour's song "Cleopatra" (lyrics by Marine Gyulumyan). The song was presented to the audience for the first time and was well warmly welcomed by the audience.  In the fall of 2019, Amalia released her second song, this time with a music video. The authors of the song "Another Chapter" are Amalia Margaryan and Vahram Yanikyan.  The video is directed by Hrant Movsisyan. The cello part of the video is performed by famous Armenian musician Artyom Manukyan. In June 2021  "Welcome to Ethernity" movie by Hrant Movsisyan was released in Armenia. The soundtrack of the movie was written by Amalia Margaryan Franklin Avetisyan. In September 2021 Amalia released her third song "Hear Me" with a music video. The authors of the song are Amalia Margaryan, Vahram Yanikyan. The music video was directed by Hrant Movsisyan. This is the second collaboration with the director after "Another Chapter song". "Hear Me"  is a song about the lack of humanity, the hunger of souls, and people who have no values. The music video of the song was shot in 2020, in Dilijan (Armenia) but the premiere was postponed because of the Pandemic and 44-day Artsakh war. At the end of the year, Amaliya is planning to release her first musical album.

Discography

Singles

Notes and references

External links 

 Official website
 Facebook Page
 Instagram Page
 YouTube Channel
 Twitter

1995 births
Living people
Musicians from Yerevan
Armenian pop singers
21st-century Armenian women singers
Armenian women singer-songwriters
Armenian Apostolic Christians